Struvite (magnesium ammonium phosphate) is a phosphate mineral with formula: NH4MgPO4·6H2O. Struvite crystallizes in the orthorhombic system as white to yellowish or brownish-white pyramidal crystals or in platy mica-like forms. It is a soft mineral with Mohs hardness of 1.5 to 2 and has a low specific gravity of 1.7. It is sparingly soluble in neutral and alkaline conditions, but readily soluble in acid.

Struvite urinary stones and crystals form readily in the urine of animals and humans that are infected with ammonia-producing organisms. They are potentiated by alkaline urine and high magnesium excretion (high magnesium/plant-based diets). They also are potentiated by a specific urinary protein in domestic cats.

Name
Struvite was first described in 1845 by the German chemist  (1811–1883), who found crystals of struvite in what he surmised had once been a medieval midden in Hamburg, Germany; he named the new mineral after the geographer and geologist  (1772–1851) of Hamburg.

Occurrence
Struvite readily forms in alkaline conditions where its constituent ions are present. In nature, it forms primarily in areas associated with organic matter decomposition, including guano deposits, basaltic caves, and marshlands. Similar conditions are found when human bladders are infected by urease-producing bacteria, when wastewater is treated, etc.

Struvite is occasionally found in canned seafood, where its appearance is that of small glass slivers, objectionable to consumers for aesthetic reasons but of no health consequence. A simple test can differentiate struvite from glass.

Struvite kidney stones
Struvite precipitates in alkaline urine, forming kidney stones. Struvite is the most common mineral found in urinary tract stones in dogs, and is found also in urinary tract stones of cats and humans. Struvite stones are potentiated by bacterial infection that hydrolyzes urea to ammonium and raises urine pH to neutral or alkaline values. Urea-splitting organisms include Proteus, Xanthomonas, Pseudomonas, Klebsiella, Staphylococcus, and Mycoplasma.

Even in the absence of infection, accumulation of struvite crystals in the urinary bladder is a problem frequently seen in housecats, with symptoms including difficulty urinating (which may be mistaken for constipation) or blood in the urine (hematuria). The protein cauxin, a protein excreted in large amounts in cat urine that acts to produce a feline pheromone, has recently been found to cause nucleation of struvite crystals in a model system containing the ions necessary to form struvite. This may explain some of the excess struvite production in domestic cats. In the past, surgery has been required to remove struvite uroliths in cats; today, special acidifying low magnesium diets may be used to dissolve sterile struvite stones.

Upper urinary tract stones that involve the renal pelvis and extend into at least 2 calyces are classified as staghorn calculi. Although all types of urinary stones can potentially form staghorn calculi, approximately 75% are composed of a struvite-carbonate-apatite matrix.

Struvite enteroliths
Struvite is a common mineral found in enteroliths (intestinal concretions) in horses.

Wastewater treatment
Struvite can be a problem in sewage and waste water treatment, particularly after anaerobic digesters release ammonium and phosphate from waste material. Struvite can form a scale on lines and belts, in centrifuges and pumps, clog system pipes and other equipment including the anaerobic digester itself. Struvite, also referred to as MAP, forms when there is a mole to mole to mole ratio (1:1:1) of magnesium, ammonia and phosphate in the wastewater. The magnesium can be found in soil, seawater as well as drinking water. Ammonia is broken down from the urea in wastewater, and phosphate, which is found through food, soaps and detergents. These elements in place, struvite is more likely to form in a high pH environment, where there is higher conductivity, lower temperatures, and higher concentrations of magnesium, ammonia and phosphate. Recovery of phosphorus from wastestreams as struvite and recycling those nutrients into agriculture as fertilizer appears promising, particularly in agricultural manure and municipal waste water treatment plants.

Having struvite scale in a wastewater treatment system can lead to great inefficiency within the plant or operation due to clogging of the pipes, pumps and equipment. There have been a few options to solve this issue, including replacing the pipes, or using a hydro-jetter or a mechanical grinder to clear them. But many lines can be underground and either of these options implies considerable downtime and labor. Chemical cleaning is now predominately used to clear systems of struvite. Chemical cleaning products have been developed to remove and prevent struvite with minimal downtime. Even a chemical-free, electric method of removing and preventing struvite has been developed and tested successfully at wastewater treatment plants in the USA. The electronic sine wave it produces is sent through the water in the pipe and is therefore effective on underground piping as well.

Uses

Use of struvite as an agricultural fertilizer was first described in 1857. It contains P and N, two of the three major plant macronutrients, with Mg being a minor macronutrient as well. Struvite can be produced from urine by adjusting pH (often just by waiting for urease-producing bacteria to work) and adding magnesium. There is considerable interest in the utility of urine-derived struvite as a fertilizer in austere situations.

References

External links 
 Website of the European Phosphorus Platform about Phosphorus Recovery

Ammonium minerals
Magnesium minerals
Phosphate minerals
Orthorhombic minerals
Minerals in space group 31
Struve family